Škrilje is a village in the Municipality of Ig in central Slovenia. The municipality is part of the traditional region of Inner Carniola and is now included in the Central Slovenia Statistical Region.

The site of an Iron Age fortified settlement has been found on Stražar Hill west of the settlement on a strategic point above the Iška Gorge.

References

External links

Škrilje on Geopedia

Populated places in the Municipality of Ig